Calgary/Springbank Airport or Springbank Airport  is an airport located in the Rocky View County community of Springbank, Alberta, an area to the west of Calgary in Alberta, Canada.

The Springbank Airport acts as a general aviation reliever for Calgary's main airport, Calgary International, and was the 5th busiest airport in Canada by total aircraft movements in 2020 and 2021. It is managed by the Calgary Airport Authority.

Due to its nature and location, Springbank is the base of operations for many flight training schools, providing flight training services for the greater Calgary area. It is home to the Calgary Flying Club, the Mount Royal University Aviation Diploma program, and the Springbank Air Training College. These operators provide various degrees of flight training, from Private Pilot to Commercial licences, and various licence ratings such as IFR, Multi-Engine, and Night. It also provides flight training for helicopter licensing, and offers many specialty programs, such as mountain flying instruction/concurrency programs.

The airport is classified as an airport of entry by Nav Canada and is staffed by the Canada Border Services Agency (CBSA). CBSA officers at this airport can handle general aviation aircraft only, with no more than 15 passengers.

This airport is also a base for aerial firefighting aircraft. A tanker base was constructed by Alberta Sustainable Resource Development (ASRD) and Conair operates a fleet of aircraft out of this base during the wild fire season.

The airport has been the host of the biennial Wings Over Springbank air show.

Fixed-base operators
Springbank Aero Services Inc.

Flight schools

Fixed wing
Calgary Flying Club
Mount Royal University
Springbank Air Training College

Rotary wing
Can-Oz Helicopters
LR Heli
Mountain View Helicopters
Red Eagle Aviation

Services

Fuel

Mobile
AvGas & JetA-1 Springbank Aero Services (Executive Flight Centre)

Stationary
AvGas Calgary Flying Club. 24 hour card lock self serve located on Taxiway "A".
Avgas & Jet A Central Aviation Inc. 24 hour card lock self serve located at end of Taxiway "E".

Towing
Springbank Aero Services (Executive Flight Centre)

Hangarage/tie down
Calgary Flying Club - tie down
Cavalier Aviation - tie down
Springbank Aero Services (Executive Flight Centre) - hangarage and tie down

Rental cars
Springbank Aero Services (Executive Flight Centre - Enterprise)

Pilot supplies
Calgary Flying Club
Springbank Air Training College

Charters
Central Aviation

Maintenance

Fixed wing
Artisan Aviation
AvWorks Aerospace Inc.
Canadian Avionics & Instruments Ltd 
Cavalier Aviation
Foster Aircraft Maintenance Ltd.
Innovative Wings
Mustang Maintenance & Repairs Ltd
Northern Avionics
Rocky Mountain Aircraft

Rotary wing
Chinook Aviation
Genesis Helicopter Services Inc.
Great Slave Helicopters

See also
List of airports in the Calgary area

References

External links
Calgary / Springbank Airport on COPA's Places to Fly airport directory
Official site
Springbank Airport Business and Pilots Association (SABPA)

Rocky View County
Certified airports in Alberta
Transport in Calgary